Energy in Azerbaijan describes energy and electricity production, consumption and export in Azerbaijan.

Azerbaijan is a major producer of crude oil and natural gas. It has one of the highest energy self-sufficiency ratios in the world.

As of 2012, the country's total greenhouse gas emissions stood at 69 MtCO₂e (million metric tons of carbon dioxide equivalent). Azerbaijan aims to reduce its emission by 35% by 2030.

History 
In 1846, Azerbaijan became the site of the world's first industrially drilled oil well. By 1899, Azerbaijan produced half of the volume of the world's oil.

The Araz hydroelectric power station with a total capacity of 22 MW was constructed in 1970, Tartar hydroelectric power station with a total capacity of 50 MW in 1976 and Shamkir hydroelectric power station with a total capacity of 380 MW in 1982.

At that time, along with the construction of power stations, electrical networks were systematically developed and the country's sustainable energy system was created. In those years, "Ali Bayramli" Thermal power station with 330 kV – “Aghdam – Ganja – Aghstafa”, “Ali Bayramli – Yashma – Derbent”, 5th Mingachevir, 500kV 1st and 2nd Absheron, “Mukhranis – Vali” and other power lines, "Yashma", "Ganja", "Agstafa" with 330/110/10 kV, Imishli with 330/110/10 kV, Absheron with 500/330/220 kV, "Hovsan", "Nizami", "Mushfig", "Sangachal", "Masalli", "Agsu" and "Babek" with 220/110/10 electrical substations have been put into operation.

$53 million loan was granted to Azerbaijan by the European Bank for Reconstruction and Development for the construction of the Yenikend hydroelectric power station in December 1995, and constructed a Yenikend HPP with a total capacity of 150 MW.

The reconstruction of the Mingachevir hydroelectric power station, 330 kV Aghjabadi, 110 kV Barda substantions and the 330kV Azerbaijan Thermal Power Station - 330 kV “Agjabadi-Imishli” transmission lines were implemented at the expense of the European Bank for Reconstruction and Development and the Islamic Development Bank.

Two gas-turbine units with a capacity of 53.5 MW each at Baku thermal power station at the expense of German bank - Bayerische Landesbank Girozentrale, and a 400MW steam gas plant at the “Shimal” power plant at the expense of the Japanese International Cooperation Bank's loan were commissioned in 2002.

On February 14, 2005, the head of state approved the State Program on “Development of the Fuel and Energy Complex (2005-2015) in the Republic of Azerbaijan”.

The electricity demand of the economy of the country has been completely paid by 12 thermal power stations such as Azerbaijan TPP, Shirvan TPP, Shimal TPP, Baku TPP, Nakhchivan TPP, Astara, Khachmaz, Sheki, Nakhchivan, Baku, Quba, Sangachal power stations, and 6 water power stations such as Mingechevir, Shamkir, Yenikend, Varvara, Araz, Vaykhir HPP. Their total capacity was about 5900 megawatts. 90 percent of electricity production in Azerbaijan accounts for TPPs, and 10 percent for hydroelectric power stations.

The Energy Regulatory Agency under the Ministry of Energy  was established on the basis of the Department for State Energy And Gas Supervision of the Ministry of Energy of the Republic of Azerbaijan by the Decree of president dated December 22, 2017, and its charter was approved.

According to the World Energy Trilemma İndex, compiled by the World Energy Council for 2017, Azerbaijan has taken the 31st place (BBA) among 125 countries.

According to the Global Energy Architecture Performance Index report 2017, compiled by the World Economic Forum, Azerbaijan ranked 36th out of 127 countries with a 0.67 score.

According to the 2016 report of the organization mentioned above, Azerbaijan ranked 32nd out of 126 countries with 0.68 score. Economic growth and development was 0,68 score, environmental sustainability 0.57 score, energy access and security 0.79 score.

On April 19, 2019, SOCAR president Rovnag Abdullayev and BP’s regional president for Azerbaijan, Georgia, and Turkey, Garry Johns signed a contract cost $6 billion. The final investment decision on the Azeri Central East (ACE) platform, which is planned to be built on the Azeri-Chirag-Gunashli (ACG) block, has been adopted at the signing ceremony. The construction is scheduled to start in 2019, and the completion is scheduled for mid-2022.

Oil
Production: -  (2008)
Consumption: -  (2007)

From 1987 to 1993, production decreased from 13.8 million tons of oil and 12.5 billion cubic meters of gas to 10.3 million tons of oil and 6.8 billion cubic meters of gas. The annual rate of decline in production was 7.1% for oil and 13.5% for gas. The exploratory drilling decreased by 17 times, or by 170,000 meters, was 10,000 meters in 1995 compared to 1970.

"Shah deniz-2" 

"Shah Deniz-2" energy strategic projects is the energy security and energy diversification project.

Contract of the Shah Deniz gas field was signed in 1996, and the first pipeline connecting the Caspian Sea with the Georgian side of the Black Sea coast was built in 1999. The Baku-Tbilisi-Ceyhan main oil export pipeline connecting the Caspian Sea with the Mediterranean and international markets was built in 2006, and the Southern Gas Pipeline in 2007.

Transparency
The 2013 report by UK-based Global Witness NGO revealed that companies working in Azerbaijan’s oil industry have no transparency and accountability. It has been documented that millions of dollars of revenue disappear into the hands of obscurely owned private companies that cooperate with SOCAR.

The report concluded that the opacity of the deals struck by Socar "is systemic" and added, 
“These findings should be of great concern to the international community as a whole. Oil and its derivative products are central to the Azerbaijani economy, making up 95% of exports in 2011. It is important for Europe that Azerbaijan keeps the oil and gas flowing and maintains a transparent and well-run energy industry. Yet this briefing shows that much of the oil business in Azerbaijan remains opaque, and corruption is still perceived to be at epidemic levels…"

Natural gas

On March 10, 2016, Natiq Aliyev, Azerbaijani energy minister, publicly said that Azerbaijan has enough gas reserves to fill the  Southern Gas Corridor (SGC). The SGC is an energy project whose goal is to move 10 billion cub meters of gas from Azerbaijan through Georgia and Turkey to Europe.

Electricity

production: 24.32 billion kWh (2017)
consumption: 17.09 billion kWh (2017)

Electrical power is the widely utilized energy source in Azerbaijan in terms of domestic and industrial use. Electricity production and its distribution are covered by the state-owned Azerenerji JSC and Azerishig JSC. The whole country's electricity demand is furnished by the power stations operating under Azerenerji. 13 of those stations are thermal power stations with the installed capacity of 5400 MW power, and 17 are hydro-power stations with the installed capacity of 1162.2 MW power. Moreover, a number of small power stations have been set up by other companies in the country by utilizing water, wind, solar, and domestic waste.

Total installed capacity in September 2019 is 6.6455 million kW. Eight thermal plants supply 80% of capacity, including Shimal-2 power station put into used in early September 2019. 12% comes from 2 hydroelectric plants (Mingachevir HPP and Shamkir HPP), and the rest from other thermal, hydro and small hydro plants. The main power plants (both are thermal) are near Shirvan (Janub TPP - 780 MW) and Mingechaur (Azerbaijan TPP - 2,400 MW).

Report of 2017  
The power of the country's electro-energy system has reached 7,172.6 MW. Currently, the system's capacity is 5200 MW and the peak power required is around 3750-3900 MW. In 2017, the production of electricity amounted to 22 209.8 million kWh including 20 445.4 million kWh at thermal power plants and 1 732.8 million kWh of electricity at hydroelectric power stations and totally decreased by 2.0% compared to the corresponding period of 2016 (22 665.7 million kWh).

Totally 4778.8 million cubic meters of natural gas and 311.5 thousand tons of mazut fuel oil were used for electricity generation during the year.

50 MVA transformer with 110/35 kV, two 110 kV circuit breakers, and 35 kV electrical equipment were installed at Hoca Hasan substation of Binagadi district. 110 kV double-circuit transmission line between 110 kV "Liman" and "White City" substations, three transformer substations with 35 / 0,4 kV were constructed.

In 2017, oil production amounted to around 38.7 million tons in the country. 28.9 million tons of extracted oil belonged to the Azeri-Chirag-Gunashli, 2.4 million tons to Shah Deniz (condensate), and 7.4 million tons to the State Oil Company of the Azerbaijan Republic.

In 2017, President Ilham Aliyev took part in the opening of the following substations:

 " Sarıcali" Substation with 110/35/10 kV in Saatli district
 "Yenikend" Substation with 110/35/6 kV in Samukh district
 “New Ganja” Substation with 110/35/10 kV in Ganja town 
 “Neftchala” Substation at 110/35/6 kV in Neftchala district
 "Garagashli" Substation with 110/35/10 kV in Salyan district
 Shamkir Automated Management and Control Center of “Azerishig” OJSC.

Hydroelectric power plants
Mingechevir Hydro Power Plant - 402 MW
Sarsang Hydro Power Plant - 50 MW
Shamkir Hydro Power Plant - 405 MW
Yenikend Hydro Power Plant - 150 MW

Foreign investment competition with non-energy sectors
In January 2015, the president of Azerbaijan, Ilham Aliyev, announced that he would direct his government to create programs to bring investment dollars to industries other than oil. Specifically, President Aliyev cited industrial and agricultural industries as an example.

Aliyev cited Azerbaijani’s economy by saying, “That’s why it’s much easier to attract investments to stable countries with socio-political stability and information growth.” He said that the banking industry will become more important in helping develop the country’s non-energy industries.

See also
Petroleum industry in Azerbaijan
Economy of Azerbaijan
Natural Resources of Azerbaijan

References

Mir-Babayev, M.F., 2011, The role of Azerbaijan in the world’s oil industry: "Oil-Industry History" (USA), v.12,#1, p.109-123

 
Economy of Azerbaijan